In automotive engineering, the firewall (American English) or bulkhead (British English) is the part of the automobile body (unibody or body-on-frame) that separates the engine compartment from the passenger compartment (driver and passengers).  It is most commonly a separate component of the body or, in monocoque construction, a separate steel pressing, but may be continuous with the floorpan, or its edges may form part of the door pillars.  The name originates from steam-powered vehicles, where the firewall separated the driver from the fire heating the boiler.

In aviation, a firewall on an aircraft isolates the engine(s) from other parts of the airframe. In single-engine aircraft, it is the part of the fuselage that separates the engine compartment from the cockpit. In most multi-engine propeller aircraft, the firewall typically divides the nacelle from the wing of the aircraft, or divides the nacelle into two zones.

Aircraft components
Automotive body parts